Apache Iceberg is an open source high-performance format for huge analytic tables. Iceberg brings the reliability and simplicity of SQL tables to big data, while making it possible for engines like Spark, Trino, Flink, Snowflake, IOMETE Dremio, Presto, Hive, Impala, StarRocks, Doris, Athena, and Pig to safely work with the same tables, at the same time. Iceberg is released under the Apache License. Iceberg addresses the performance and usability challenges of using Apache Hive tables in large and demanding data lake environments.

History 
Iceberg was started at Netflix by Ryan Blue and Dan Weeks. Hive was used by many different services and engines in the Netflix infrastructure. Hive was never able to guarantee the correctness and did not provide stable atomic transactions. Many at Netflix avoided using these services and making changes to the data to avert unintended consequences from the Hive format. Ryan Blue set out to address three issues that faced the Hive table by creating Iceberg:

 Ensure correctness of the data and support ACID transactions.
 Improve performance by enabling finer-grained operations to be done at the file granularity for optimal writes.
 Simplify and obfuscate general operation and maintenance of tables.

Iceberg development started in 2017. The project was open-sourced and donated to the Apache Software Foundation in November 2018. In May 2020, the Iceberg project graduated to become a top level Apache project.

Iceberg is used by multiple companies including Airbnb, Apple, Expedia, LinkedIn, Adobe, Lyft, and many more.

In August 2021, some of the founding members of the project created Tabular which offers a managed service that enables you to use and secure Iceberg tables in any query engine.

In early 2022, Snowflake announced that they would support Iceberg as one of their external table formats.

In 2022, YCombinator invested in IOMETE serverless lakehouse built on Apache Iceberg and Apache Spark. Platform also provides serverless spark jobs, an SQL editor, and an advanced data catalog.

See also 

 List of Apache Software Foundation projects

References 

SQL
Free system software
Hadoop
Cloud platforms
Java platform